Justin James Bour (born May 28, 1988) is an American former professional baseball first baseman. He played in Major League Baseball (MLB) for the Miami Marlins, Philadelphia Phillies, and Los Angeles Angels, in Nippon Professional Baseball (NPB) for the Hanshin Tigers, and in the KBO League for the LG Twins.

Early life 
Bour was born in Washington, D.C. to Jim and Tracey Bour. His father was employed by the Secret Service and was mainly assigned to presidential detail. He also has two siblings, Jason and Jenna Bour.

While living in Chantilly, Virginia, Bour attended Westfield High School. He helped lead the team to a division title. During high school, Bour pitched and played first base. In high school, he earned first-team All-Met honors. He earned this title in 2006 after being named Honorable Mention All-Met selection his junior year in 2005. During the same year, Bour was named first team All-Met his high school won their division title. In his senior year, Bour batted .523 with 23 runs batted in (RBIs).

College career 
Bour attended George Mason University in Fairfax, Virginia. Bour's father, mother, and older brother also attended the university. Bour's father played volleyball, his mother played softball and volleyball, and his brother, Jason, played baseball. His older brother Jason has the 12th-highest batting average in the school's history and was drafted in the 23rd round by the Cincinnati Reds in 2007.

While attending George Mason University Justin Bour also created his own legacy. He had 1,273 putouts which placed him first in the category, tied for second in career home runs with 46, third in RBIs with 187, fourth in total bases with 404, fifth in fielding percentage with .986, sixth in slugging percentage with .621, and 11th in batting average .347. During his three years at George Mason University, Bour averaged 15 home runs and 62 runs batted with an OPS better than .901. He set a school record on March 6, 2007, when he hit two grand slams and had nine RBIs in a 28–1 victory of Coppin State. In 2008, he played collegiate summer baseball with the Bourne Braves of the Cape Cod Baseball League.

These record numbers led to Bour being drafted in the 2009 Major League Amateur Draft by the Chicago Cubs in the 25th round, even though he was thought to be a mid-round selection. Since 1978, 52 players have been signed or drafted in the baseball program at George Mason. Bour still practices there in the off season.

Professional career

Chicago Cubs
Bour made his way through the Cubs minor league organization, peaking in 2012 with the Double-A Tennessee Smokies. Bour batted .283/.360/.455 and drove in 110 runs. He was named to the Southern League Postseason All-Star team. In the second half of the following season Bour hit 16 home runs with the Smokies but was blocked on the roster for first base by Anthony Rizzo. Bour was drafted by the Marlins in the Rule 5 draft in December 2013.

Miami Marlins

Bour was first called up to the majors with the Marlins on June 1, 2014. Bour spent a majority of the 2015 season with the Marlins after proving himself with the Marlins in 2014. Bour did extremely well with the Marlins in 2015. On May 17, 2015 Bour made headlines for breaking up Shelby Miller’s no hit bid at Marlins Park with two outs in the bottom of the ninth inning. He also homered in four straight games June 30 – July 3, 2015. He became the eighth Marlin in franchise history to accomplish this. In October Bour was named the National League Rookie of the Month for September. After the All-Star break Bour hit 13 home runs and drove in 46 runs. This production helped offset the power hitting that the Marlins lost after a hamate injury sustained by Giancarlo Stanton in June. Bour led the Marlins in RBIs that season with 73 and had 23 homers which placed him second behind Stanton for the season. Bour batted .262/.321/.479 for the season.

Bour became a regular in the Marlins lineup in 2016 after finishing 5th in the National League Rookie of the Year voting the season prior after being called up. Bour was able to join the team full-time after the Marlins traded away first baseman Mike Morse who was not able to produce when signed to the full-time first base position. Bour started off strong in the 2016 season by hitting 15 home runs and 46 RBIs and batting .268 by the end of June. In June alone, Bour hit six home runs and 20 RBIs with a batting line of .317/.411/.651. This hot streak was snapped when Bour became injured July 2 by rolling his ankle against the Atlanta Braves, he was placed on the disabled list July 6. While recovering Bour played a few games with the Triple-A New Orleans team before rejoining the Marlins. The Triple-A New Orleans stint did not go as planned for Bour as he was shut down by the Marlins from continuing with the minors. Bour did return to the Marlins though and was allowed to participate in infield and batting practice with the team at the beginning of August. Since the 15 day DL leave turned into a 60-day DL for Bour he did no return to the team until September 6. He did remain uninjured until the end of the season but did not hit any more home runs.

Bour had a successful season in 2017, even having a couple firsts for his Major League career. One of the firsts for Bour was stealing a base against the Arizona Diamondbacks. Bour stole second base and had the pitcher, Zack Greinke, and catcher, Jeff Mathis, sign the base for him.  Bour also was invited to participate in the 2017 Home Run Derby. Bour used what he called doughnut power during his home run derby competition and was even given doughnuts by his teammate Stanton during the competition. Bour hit 22 home runs in the first round, setting a record for the fourth most home runs in that round but was knocked out of the competition by Aaron Judge who hit 23 home runs. Bour finished the season with 25 home runs and 83 RBIs. 

During the off season before 2018 Bour was involved in an arbitration case against the Marlins. Bour won his case and his salary for 2018 was set at $3.4 million.

In 2018 with the Marlins, Bour batted .227/.347/.412 with 19 home runs and 54 RBIs in 374 at bats.

Philadelphia Phillies
On August 10, 2018, the Philadelphia Phillies acquired Bour and cash considerations from the Miami Marlins for minor league pitcher McKenzie Mills. As a bench player for Philadelphia, Bour batted .224/.296/.347 with one home run and five RBIs in 54 plate appearances. After the 2018 season, the Phillies put Bour through waivers, removing him from their 40-man roster. The Phillies did not tender Bour a contract offer, making him a free agent.

Los Angeles Angels
On December 15, 2018, the Los Angeles Angels signed Bour to a one-year, $2.5 million contract. Bour elected free agency following the 2019 season.

Hanshin Tigers
On December 14, 2019, Bour signed with the Hanshin Tigers of the Nippon Professional Baseball(NPB).

On November 20, 2020, he became a free agent.

San Francisco Giants
On March 2, 2021, Bour signed a minor league contract with the San Francisco Giants organization. He was assigned to the Triple-A Sacramento River Cats to begin the 2021 season. On June 25, 2021, the Giants released Bour, making him a free agent. Bour put posted a .772 OPS while hitting .213 with six home runs and 17 RBI in 108 at-bats during 33 games at Triple-A. Giants manager Gabe Kapler said it was a “mutually discussed decision.”

LG Twins
On June 27, 2021, Bour signed with the LG Twins of the KBO League. In 32 games, he batted .170/.265/.280 with three home runs and 17 RBIs. Bour was not re-signed for the 2022 season and later became a free agent.

Diablos Rojos del México
On December 29, 2021, Bour signed with the Diablos Rojos del México of the Mexican League. Bour appeared in 16 games for México in 2022, batting .327/.463/.519 with two home runs and nine RBI. He was released on May 18, 2022.

On February 10, 2023, Bour announced his retirement from professional baseball via Twitter, noting that he would be completing his degree at George Mason University.

References

External links

George Mason Patriots bio

1988 births
Living people
American expatriate baseball players in Japan
Arizona League Cubs players
Baseball players from Washington, D.C.
Boise Hawks players
Bourne Braves players
Daytona Cubs players
George Mason Patriots baseball players
Gigantes de Carolina players
Hanshin Tigers players
Jacksonville Jumbo Shrimp players
Jupiter Hammerheads players
Los Angeles Angels players
Major League Baseball first basemen
Miami Marlins players
New Orleans Zephyrs players
Nippon Professional Baseball first basemen
Peoria Chiefs players
Philadelphia Phillies players
Salt Lake Bees players
Tennessee Smokies players